Warana Raja Maha Vihara (Sinhalaː වාරණ රජ මහා විහාරය) is an ancient Buddhist temple situated in Thihariya, Gampaha District, Sri Lanka. Currently this temple has been recognized as an archaeological protected site in Gampaha District by Archaeological department.

History
Warana Raja Maha Vihara is believed to have been built during the reign of King Devanampiyathissa (307–267 BC) and according to the temple chronicles preserved at the Vihara, later renovations haven been undertaken by King Valagamba (103 BCE and c.89–77 BCE), Nissanka Malla (1187–1196), Kirti Sri Rajasinha (1747-1782) and Parakramabahu VI.

According to the Dr. Senarath Paranavithana's book Inscriptions of Ceylon, Part I, a Brahmin inscription, found in the vihara premises, has been interpreted as follows:.

The temple

The temple is mainly consist of three levels as Pahala maluwa, Meda maluwa and Ihala maluwa. In the first level the Sangawasaya and the Dharama Hall is located and in the middle level the drip ledged cave temple with its ancient Stupa can be seen. It is said that stupa is around 800 years old. Inside the cave temple many of Buddha statues and paintings are found. The canopy of the cave has been decorated with lotus flowers and with various other flower designs. In the top level another Stupa and Cave temple can be seen.

See also
 List of Archaeological Protected Monuments in Gampaha District

References

External links
 Varana Temple

Buddhist temples in Gampaha District
Buddhist caves in Sri Lanka
Archaeological protected monuments in Gampaha District